In Greek mythology, Ctimene (Ancient Greek:) was an Ithacan princess as the daughter of King Laertes and Anticlea.

Family 
Ctimene was the younger sister of Odysseus, the legendary king of Ithaca.

Mythology 
Ctimene was raised by her parents alongside the servant Eumaeus who was treated almost as her equal. She was married off to Eurylochus of Same for a massive bride price. Her husband accompanied Odysseus on his journey from Troy but, like all of Odysseus's men, died before reaching home.

Notes

References
 Odyssey, 15.361–379.
Homer, The Odyssey with an English Translation by A.T. Murray, PH.D. in two volumes. Cambridge, MA., Harvard University Press; London, William Heinemann, Ltd. 1919. . Online version at the Perseus Digital Library. Greek text available from the same website.

Princesses in Greek mythology
Characters in the Odyssey

Ithacan characters in Greek mythology